Full On... Mask Hysteria (also known as Full On ·· Mask Hysteria or Full On .. Mask Hysteria) is the second studio album by British duo Altern 8. It was released on 13 July 1992 and featured six of the act's first seven singles released in 1991 and 1992. The vinyl release included "Free Limited Edition 12" Exclusive Megamix" of the album which featured "Shame '92" with Evelyn 'Champagne' King and remix of "Move My Body" by Joey Beltram. The 2008 CD reissue included remix of "Infiltrate 202" by Joey Beltram. On September 2016, duo announced the "Remastered Edition" of the album, which was released as set of 3 12" vinyl records and for digital downloading and streaming on their official website. The Remastered Edition featured remixes by KiNK, Shadow Dancer, 2 Bad Mice and Luke Vibert.

Track listing

Charts

References

1992 debut albums
Altern-8 albums